is a Japanese play written by Hisashi Inoue.

Plays
 It was performed by Komatsuza as their 34th Play, from September 3 to 18, 1994, directed by Hitoshi Uyama, starring by Masayo Umezawa and Kei Suma.  It has been performed frequently not only all over Japan but also overseas. Paris in 1997, Moscow in 2001, Hong Kong in 2004 and London in 2007.
 Now, the play is performed by Komatsuza and some theatrical companies.

Books
The play Chichi to Kuraseba (Living with my Father) is published by Shinchosha in 2001.

The play was transferred into three languages and published by Komatsuza.
 The Face of Jizo in English by Roger Pulvers in 2004.
 Die Tage mit Vater (The Day with Father) in German by Isolde Asai in 2006.
 Mio Padre (My Father) in Italian by Franco Gervasio and Ai Aoyama in 2006,.

CD
The play is recorded for a CD with starring Tomoko Saito and Kei Masu, published by Shinchosha, on April 25, 2003.

Film

The play is adapted for a film Chichi to Kuraseba directed by Kazuo Kuroki, starring by Rie Miyazawa, Yoshio Harada and Tadanobu Asano, in 2004. It was filmed as the 3rd and concluding volume of Kazuo Kuroki's Trilogy works for War Requiem.

See also
 Atomic bombings of Hiroshima and Nagasaki

References

External links
 Komatsuza
 The Face of Jizo The public reading events in Toronto and Vancouver, 2004–2006
 The Face of Jizo at Arcola Theatre in London, 2007
 The Face of Jizo Play of the Month of The Japan Foundation, in August 2007
 Performing Father–Daughter Love "Inoue Hisashi's Face of Jizo" by Tomoko Aoyama
 Chichi to Kuraseba - TV Tokyo Medianet - rerun the film at Iwanami hall in 2005
 Chichi to Kuraseba

Japanese plays
1994 plays
Japanese books
2001 non-fiction books
Plays about the atomic bombings of Hiroshima and Nagasaki
Japanese plays adapted into films
Shinchosha books